Samuel Spencer (18 January 1902 – 1987) was an English footballer who played in the English Football League for Bristol Rovers, New Brighton and Stoke.

Career
Spencer was born in Middlesbrough and joined Stoke in September 1921 from amateur side Oakhill. He played once for Stoke in the 1921–22 season, in a 1–0 win against Coventry City on 11 March 1922. He left the Victoria Ground at the end of the season and went and joined New Brighton. Spencer then went on to play for Mid Rhondda, Aberdeen, Bristol Rovers, Port Vale and Winsford United whilst he also had a second spell with New Brighton.

Career statistics
Source:

References

1902 births
1987 deaths
English footballers
Footballers from Middlesbrough
Association football wingers
Stoke City F.C. players
New Brighton A.F.C. players
Mid Rhondda F.C. players
Aberdeen F.C. players
Bristol Rovers F.C. players
Newry City F.C. players
Port Vale F.C. players
Winsford United F.C. players
English Football League players